G4 Love Songs is the fifth album released by X Factor runners-up G4. The album of love songs features Lesley Garrett, Merrill Osmond, Oli Nez and The City of Prague Philharmonic Orchestra. G4 Love Songs was funded by fans through PledgeMusic, where the funding reached 112%. Part of the pledge money was donated to Breast Cancer Care.

Track listing
 "I'd Do Anything for Love (But I Won't Do That)" featuring Lesley Garrett
 "Your Song"
 "Tomorrow"
 "A Million Love Songs"
 "(Everything I Do) I Do It for You"
 "Because We Believe"
 "Can't Help Falling in Love"
 "I Don't Want to Miss a Thing"
 "Love Me for a Reason" featuring Merrill Osmond & Oli Nez
 "Amigos Para Siempre"
 "I'll Be There" Featuring Oli Nez
 "All I Ask of You" featuring Lesley Garrett
 "All of Me"

Charts

References

G4 (group) albums
2017 albums